Kim Hye-youn (born 3 June 1960) is a South Korean basketball player. She competed in the women's tournament at the 1988 Summer Olympics.

References

1960 births
Living people
South Korean women's basketball players
Olympic basketball players of South Korea
Basketball players at the 1988 Summer Olympics
Place of birth missing (living people)